Acanthocreagris is a genus in the family of pseudoscorpions called Neobisiidae. The genus was first described in 1974 by Volker Mahnert

Taxonomy
Acanthocreagris contains the following species:
 Acanthocreagris lucifuga
 Acanthocreagris aelleni
 Acanthocreagris pyrenaica
 Acanthocreagris gallica
 Acanthocreagris corsa

References

Neobisiidae
Pseudoscorpion genera
Taxa named by Volker Mahnert